Long Cheng (born 22 March 1995 in Yueyang) is a Chinese professional football player who currently plays as a defender for Zhejiang Greentown.

Club career
In 2014, Long Cheng started his professional footballer career with Wuhan Zall in the China League One. On 10 July 2015, Long transferred to Chinese Super League side Henan Jianye. On 11 July 2015, Long made his debut for Henan in the 2015 Chinese Super League against Chongqing Lifan, coming on as a substitute for Yin Hongbo in the 90th minute. He would go on to establish himself as a regular within the squad until the emergence of Han Xuan and Chen Hao saw him allowed to leave the club for Jiangsu Suning on 27 July 2019.

On 27 February 2020, Long transferred to second tier football club Zhejiang Greentown. He would go on to make his debut for the club on 12 September 2020 in a league game against Guizhou Hengfeng that ended in a 1-1 draw. After only one season he would loaned out to another second tier club in Sichuan Jiuniu on 31 July 2021. On his return to Zhejiang he would be moved to the reserve squad.

Career statistics 
Statistics accurate as of match played 31 January 2023.

References

External links
 

1995 births
Living people
Chinese footballers
Footballers from Hunan
People from Yueyang
Wuhan F.C. players
Henan Songshan Longmen F.C. players
Jiangsu F.C. players
Zhejiang Professional F.C. players
Chinese Super League players
China League One players
Association football defenders
Footballers at the 2018 Asian Games
Asian Games competitors for China
21st-century Chinese people